Dolly Sayontoni  is a Bangladeshi playback singer and businesswoman.  She releases solo, duet, and mixed albums and also songs for Bangladeshi cinema. She released 15 solo albums, over 100 duet songs and mixed albums and also sings in over 700 Bengali films. She has sung in many hit film songs including “Tomare tomare”, “O Pakhi Re”, “Tui Jodi Hoiti vala”, “Ek Jhak Pakhi”, "Boli Boli Kore".

Early life 
Dolly Shaontoni started working as a child artist in Bangladesh Radio. Her radio show was called Kolokakoli. She started working as a child singer listed only for Bangladesh Radio in 1984. Her first album was released in 1989.  Milton Khandokar released her first album.

Personal life 
Doly's mother Manoora Begum was also a musician. She used to sing regularly at the 'Durbar' event of Bangladesh Radio. A song titled 'Curly Curly Hair' was quite popular in her voice.

Discography

Solo albums

Mixed albums

Notable track

Filmography

References

External links

20th-century Bangladeshi women singers
20th-century Bangladeshi singers
Bangladeshi pop singers
Year of birth missing (living people)
Living people
21st-century Bangladeshi women singers
21st-century Bangladeshi singers